CKTK-FM is a Canadian radio station that broadcasts an adult hits format at 97.7 FM in Kitimat, British Columbia. The station is branded as Bounce 97.7. CKTK is owned by Bell Media.

The station originally began broadcasting in 1964 at 1230 AM, until the move to 97.7 on the FM dial was made in 2004.

In 2011, CKTK was rebranded as EZ Rock.

As part of a mass format reorganization by Bell Media, on May 18, 2021, CKTK flipped to adult hits, and adopted the Bounce branding.

Past station logo

References

External links
 Bounce 97.7
 

Ktk
Ktk
Ktk
Radio stations established in 1964
1964 establishments in British Columbia
Kitimat